Altra College is a special education school with branches in Amsterdam, Hoofddorp, Purmerend en Krommenie. 

Altra College is a school for children who have problems dealing with fellow students, teachers and/or parents, or have psychological problems. Some students get directly applied from elementary school, while others have followed regular high school for some time.

Branches 
There are 7 branches of the Altra College: 

 Altra College Bleichrodt - Amsterdam
 Altra College Centrum - Amsterdam
 Altra College Arkin - Amsterdam
 Altra College Zuidoost - Amsterdam
 Altra College Haarlemmermeer - Hoofddorp
 Altra College Waterland - Purmerend
 Altra College Zaanstreek - Krommenie

Furthermore, Altra College works together with: 

 The Bascule Youth psychiatric AMC - Amsterdam
 The Koppeling - Amsterdam
 Purmer College - Amsterdam

External links 
 Altra website

Special schools in the Netherlands
Schools in Amsterdam
Haarlemmermeer
Purmerend
Zaanstad